Constitutional Assembly elections were held in the Dominican Republic on 8 December 1946. The role of the Assembly was to review and amend certain articles of the constitution.

References

Dominican Republic
1946 in the Dominican Republic
Elections in the Dominican Republic
Election and referendum articles with incomplete results
December 1946 events in North America